Monte Carlo Country Club (MCCC) is a tennis club in the commune of Roquebrune-Cap-Martin, Alpes-Maritimes, Provence-Alpes-Côte d'Azur, France. It is the home of the ATP Tour's Monte Carlo Masters tournament. It is also the base of the Monte Carlo Tennis Academy.

Despite the club's name, it is not located in Monte Carlo or even in Monaco, but just 150 meters outside the Monaco's northeastern border.

See also
 List of tennis stadiums by capacity

References

External links
Monte Carlo Country Club website
Monte Carlo Tennis Academy website
The Esteemed Institution of the Monte-Carlo Country Club

Tennis venues in France
Sports venues in Alpes-Maritimes
Tennis clubs
Outdoor arenas